Waqrayuq (Quechua waqra horn, -yuq a suffix to indicate ownership, "the one with a horn", Hispanicized spelling Huajrayoj) is a  mountain in the Andes of Bolivia. It is situated in the Potosí Department, Sud Lípez Province, in the north of the Esmoruco Municipality. Waqrayuq lies south-east of the mountain P'aqu Urqu and north-west of the mountain Muruq'u.

References 

Mountains of Potosí Department